Ethmia notatella is a moth in the family Depressariidae. It is found in the Florida Keys, the Bahamas, Hispaniola, Puerto Rico and the Lesser Antilles (Curacao).

The ground color of the forewings is white or cream-white, with black markings, reflecting metallic blue-green. The ground color of the hindwings is white, becoming brown at the apex. Adults are on wing in March (in the Bahamas), from April to May (in Haiti), from June to July (Puerto Rico) and in April and from August to September (the Florida Keys).

References

External links
 Ethmia notatella at Barcode of Life Data Systems (BOLD)

Moths described in 1863
notatella